This was the third edition of the tournament. It was held after a one-year pause.

Seeds

Draw

Finals

Top half

Bottom half

References
 Main Draw
 Qualifying Draw

IS Open de Tênis - Singles